Rafael Otero (born 14 December 1954) is a Colombian footballer. He played in four matches for the Colombia national football team from 1979 to 1981. He was also part of Colombia's squad for the 1979 Copa América tournament.

References

External links
 

1954 births
Living people
Colombian footballers
Colombia international footballers
Place of birth missing (living people)
Association football midfielders
Deportivo Cali footballers